The 2007 Fort Worth mayoral election took place on May 12, 2007, to elect the Mayor of Fort Worth, Texas. The election was held concurrently with various other local elections, and was officially nonpartisan. The election saw the reelection of incumbent mayor Mike Moncrief.

The mayoral term in Fort Worth is two years.

If no candidate received a majority of the vote in the general election, a runoff would have been held.

General election

Results

References

2007 Texas elections
2007 United States mayoral elections
2007
Non-partisan elections